Introduction to Economic Analysis is a university microeconomics textbook by Caltech Professor Preston McAfee. It is available free of charge under Creative Commons license  (an open source); under this "license that requires attribution, users can pick and choose chapters or integrate with their own material".

Introduction to Economic Analysis was the first published complete textbook being openly available online. McAfee was named SPARC innovator for year 2009  for making the book freely accessible.

The book has been updated three times since it was first introduced. Version 2 is available online from Professor McAfee.

Version 3 is co-authored with Professor Tracy Lewis of the Fuqua School of Business and was published by Flat World Knowledge in 2009 under a Creative Commons license.  Introduction to Economic Analysis is already in use on campuses from Harvard to New York University.

References

External links
 Introduction to Economic Analysis 2009. McAfee, R. Preston and Tracy R. Lewis.  Revised and expanded version published  as an open textbook for intermediate microeconomics with integrated introductory material by Flat World Knowledge, Irvington, New York.

Microeconomics
Economics textbooks
Creative Commons-licensed books